Insane Pools: Off the Deep End is a home improvement show airing on Animal Planet and DIY Network that follows pool designer Lucas Congdon and his team from Lucas Lagoons. Congdon and his team renovate existing pools and build new ones on residential properties, primarily with the use of hand-selected stones from Tennessee

Series overview

Season 1 (2015)

Season 2 (2016)

Season 3 (2018)

References

External links
 
 Insane Pools at Animal Planet
 Lucas Lagoons

Animal Planet original programming
2015 American television series debuts
DIY Network original programming